Trains'n'Roses is a 1998 German-Finnish romantic comedy film directed by Peter Lichtefeld.

Plot 
Hannes, a truck driver from Germany, is a train timetable enthusiast who dreams of winning the first prize at the International Timetable Contest that is to be held in Inari, Finland. When his boss ruins his plans to travel to Inari, Hannes knocks his boss unconscious and leaves the country. While on his trip to Finland by train, his boss is found dead at his office, making Hannes the prime suspect. During his journey, unaware that he is being pursued, Hannes meets many new people, including the love of his life.

Cast

References

External links 
 
 

1998 films
1998 romantic comedy films
German romantic comedy films
Finnish romantic comedy films
1990s Finnish-language films
1990s German-language films
Films set in Finland
Films set in Germany
Films shot in Finland
Films shot in Germany
Rail transport films
German comedy road movies
1998 multilingual films
German multilingual films
Finnish multilingual films
1990s comedy road movies
1990s German films